Platystigma is a genus of flowering plants belonging to the family Papaveraceae.

Its native range is California.

Species:
 Platystigma lineare Benth.

References

Papaveraceae
Papaveraceae genera